Eupsilia tristigmata, known generally as the three-spotted sallow or brown fruitworm, is a species of cutworm or dart moth in the family Noctuidae. It is found in North America.

The MONA or Hodges number for Eupsilia tristigmata is 9935.

References

Further reading

 
 
 

Eupsilia
Articles created by Qbugbot
Moths described in 1877